Katturumbinum Kathu Kuthu is a 1986 Indian Malayalam film, directed by Girish. The film stars Jagathy Sreekumar, Innocent, Mukesh and KPAC Lalitha in the lead roles. The film has a musical score by Kannur Rajan.

Cast
Mukesh as Soman
Maniyanpilla Raju as Babu
Surekha as Prasanna K. Pilla
KPAC Lalitha as Janakiyamma
Nedumudi Venu as P. R. Keshava Pilla
Jose as Prashobhan K. Pilla
Lissy as Prabha K. Pilla
Mala Aravindan as Johnny
Jagathy Sreekumar as Gillet Sett
Innocent
K. P. A. C. Azeez
Lalithasree
Thodupuzha Vasanthi

Soundtrack
The music was composed by Kannur Rajan and the lyrics were written by Panthalam Sudhakaran.

References

External links
 

1986 films
1980s Malayalam-language films
Films shot in Kollam